Muharrem Qena (22 June 1930 – 25 September 2006) was a Kosovo Albanian actor, director, writer and singer. He went to high school in Prishtina, and he completed film school in Belgrade. He is among the noted directors who staged their works at the National Theatre of Kosovo.

He was born in Mitrovica, Kosovo (then Kingdom of Yugoslavia) in 1930 and was one of the founders of the theatrical scene in Kosovo and of Albanian light music. He immersed his great talent of a theatre director, actor, writer and singer/songwriter into becoming one of the most fruitful artistic creators. Qena directed over 200 plays, several of which were awarded in the former Yugoslavia, including ‘Bashkëshortet’, The Lady of the Camellias, Erveheja, Men of Broken Hopes, Enemy of the People, Ambrosio, etc. He remains one of the most awarded Kosovo artists. His production of Erveheja received five most renowned awards at the national meeting of  theatres in 1967, in Novi Sad.

He also directed numerous TV dramas as well as short films and documentaries. Also, he performed as a film actor in Kapiten Lleshi, Proka, The rabbit with five paws and Kukumi. The author of the awarded theatre play, Bashkeshortet and playwright of others staged in Kosovo. Funder of theatres in Prizren, Gjakova and Gnjilane. Singer and author of contemporary songs in the 60’s that resist the years: Kaçurrelja, Shokut, Lamtumirë, Mine, Tetori. Qena was awarded the Lifetime Achievement Award at Kosovo’s international theatre festival in September 2004. He died on 25 September 2006, in Prishtina. He had three daughters, one son, and five grandchildren.

References
Elsie, Robert. "Qena, Muharrem" in Historical Dictionary of Kosovo. Scarecrow Press. 2010. Page 228.

External links
 

1930 births
2006 deaths
Musicians from Mitrovica, Kosovo
Kosovan male actors
Kosovan male film actors
Kosovan singers
20th-century Albanian male singers
Yugoslav male singers